is the twelfth solo album by Susumu Hirasawa.

Setting itself apart from previous albums, electronic sounds are toned down significantly in favor of strings and other classical instruments.

Track listing

Personnel
 Susumu Hirasawa - Vocals, Guitars, Keyboards, Personal computer, Digital audio workstation, Synthesizers, Sampler, Sequencer, Programming, Production
 Masanori Chinzei - Recording, Mixing, Mastering
 Syotaro Takami and S.L. Surovec - Translation
 non graph (Toshifumi Nakai) - Design
 Presented by Chaos Union: Kenji sato, Rihito Yumoto, Mika Hirano, Kinuko Mochizuki and Misato Oguro

References

External links
 The Secret of the Flowers of Phenomenon
 Interactive Live Show 2013 "Nomonos and Imium" Live Report

Susumu Hirasawa albums
2012 albums